Killing Moon: The Best of Echo & the Bunnymen is a compilation album by Echo & the Bunnymen, which was released on 3 December 2007 on the Music Club Deluxe label.

Track listing

Disc one
"Pictures on My Wall" – 2.55
"The Puppet" – 3.07
"Do it Clean" – 2.47
"Crocodiles" – 2.40
"Rescue" – 4.30
"All That Jazz" – 2.48
"Villiers Terrace" – 2.47
"Show of Strength" – 4.50
"Over the Wall" – 6.01
"A Promise" – 4.06
"With a Hip" – 3.18
"All My Colours" – 4.04
"The Cutter" – 3.55
"The Back of Love" – 3.16
"Higher Hell" – 5.02
"Gods Will Be Gods" – 5.27
"Never Stop" – 3.33
"Heads Will Roll" – 3.32

Disc two
"The Killing Moon" – 5.49
"Silver" – 3.22
"Angels and Devils" – 4.24
"Ocean Rain" – 5.13
"My Kingdom" – 4.07
"Seven Seas" – 3.22
"Crystal Days" – 2.26
"Bring On the Dancing Horses" – 4.00
"People Are Strange" – 3.38
"Bedbugs and Ballyhoo" – 3.30
"The Game" – 3.53
"Lost and Found" – 3.39
"Thorn of Crowns" – 4.54
"Lips Like Sugar" – 4.54
"Zimbo" (Live) – 3.56
"Do It Clean" (Live) – 6.36
"Ocean Rain" (Live) – 5.19
"The Killing Moon" (Live) – 3.25

References

2007 greatest hits albums
Echo & the Bunnymen compilation albums